Sruthy Sithara (Malayalam: ശ്രുതി സിത്താര; born 1992/1993) is an Indian transgender model. Born in Vaikom, Kerala, Sithara experienced gender dysphoria growing up, but embraced her identity and came out after college. Sithara was one of four transgender people in the employment of the Government of Kerala, working in their Social Justice Department.  

Sithara began modeling in 2018. In 2021, Sithara was crowned Miss Trans Global 2021 after representing India in the eponymous beauty pageant. Sithara became the first Indian transgender woman to win an international beauty pageant. She has been described as an LGBT+ rights activist and has expressed a desire to pursue a career in acting.

Early life 
Sruthy Sithara was born  as Praveen in her hometown of Vaikom, Kerala. Studying at a residential school in Kottayam, Sithara was unaware of the transgender community until Class XII and experienced gender dysphoria and transphobia whilst growing up.

Sithara attended college in the city of Kochi, Kerala, where she first learned of the transgender community. She began to work a corporate job in the city. Gradually, she began coming out as transgender. Two of her friends helped her come out to her family successfully. She was also met with acceptance by her friends and colleagues, although she recounted undergoing rejection and difficulty through the process in an interview with the Deccan Chronicle in 2018.

Career 
In 2018, at the age of twenty-five, Sithara worked as a project assistant in the transgender wing of the Government of Kerala's Social Justice Department and was one of the first four transgender people in their employment; she was the first in her position. She once worked with K. K. Shailaja, the lauded former health minister of Kerala. Sithara told the Deccan Chronicle in 2018 of her aim to become the country's first transgender Indian Administrative Service (IAS) officer. Sithara started modeling in 2018, acting in local advertisements and albums. She won Queen of Dhwayah 2018, the second edition of Kerala's first beauty pageant for transgender women.

Miss Trans Global 2021 
Sithara represented India in Miss Trans Global 2021, an international beauty pageant for transgender women which began in 2020. Sithara spent six months preparing for the pageant, guided by actor Namitha Marimuthu and make-up artist Renju Renjimar, and six months competing. Although Miss Trans Global 2021 was to be hosted in London, COVID-19 restrictions rendered the pageant an online event.

On 1 December, Sithara was crowned both the winner and the Most Eloquent Queen of The Year 2021. On Instagram, she dedicated her crown to her late mother and her late friend Anannyah Kumari Alex, a radio and news anchor and the first transgender candidate for legislative assembly elections in Kerala, who died by suicide in July 2021 after she suffered ongoing pain and genital mutilation in a botched gender confirmation surgery. Sithara was congratulated on Twitter by R. Bindu, the Minister for Higher Education and Social Justice of Kerala.

Advocacy 
Sithara was described by The Hindu as an LGBTQ+ rights activist and has received recognition as such after the contest. Miss Sahhara, the founder of Miss Trans Global, praised her for her advocacy. She founded an online LGBTQ+ advocacy campaign named Kaleidoscope. As part of the campaign, she has attended sessions both online and in colleges throughout Kerala. She has also founded the Rise Up Forum, which focuses more broadly on societal and environmental issues. She inaugurated a wall art program and four murals painted on the walls of Fort Kochi for the Rise Up Forum in 2022.

Future projects 
In a 2021 interview with The New Indian Express, Sithara expressed her desire to pursue a career in acting and for transgender representation in Malayalam cinema to improve. She is set to make her acting debut in a heretofore unnamed Telugu film.

Personal life 
Sithara lives in Vaikom, Kerala, in southern India. She is currently in a relationship with theatre artist Daya Gayathri after Gayathri supported her through a major breakup. They are the first lesbian-transgender couple in Kerala to come out publicly. The couple had gained a following on TikTok, a social media platform, and faced criticism directed towards them on social media.

Selected works

References

External links 
Miss Trans Global 2021 results

Year of birth missing (living people)
Living people
Indian beauty pageant winners
Indian female models
Transgender rights activists
Indian LGBT rights activists
Indian LGBT artists
Indian LGBT entertainers
Indian LGBT actors
Indian women activists
Transgender entertainers
Transgender female models
Lesbian actresses
Transgender actresses
Models (profession)